The women's 1500 metres event  at the 2011 European Athletics Indoor Championships was held at March 4–6 with the final being held on March 6 at 16:00 local time.

Records

Results

Heat
First 2 in each heat and 3 best performers advanced to the Semifinals. The heats were held at 17:30.

Final 
The final was held at 17:15.

References 

1500 metres at the European Athletics Indoor Championships
2011 European Athletics Indoor Championships
2011 in women's athletics